Tahani is a given name. It may refer to:

Tahani al-Gebali (born 1950), Egyptian judge
Tahani Rached, Canadian Egyptian documentary filmmaker
Tahani Toson (born 1971), Egyptian volleyball player

See also
Tahani Al-Jamil (The Good Place character), character in The Good Place
"Tahani Al-Jamil" (The Good Place episode), third episode of season 1 of the series